Josef Ambor (28 July 1908 - 1970) was a British cinematographer.

Selected filmography
 Lady in the Spa (1929)
 The Case of Charles Peace (1949)
 The Floating Dutchman (1952)
 Wide Boy (1952)
 Dangerous Voyage (1954)
 The Brain Machine (1955)
 Little Red Monkey (1957)
 The Strange World of Planet X (1958)
 Wrong Number (1959)

References

External links
 

1908 births
1970 deaths
Date of death unknown
British cinematographers